The Lives of the Saints is a sixteen-volume collection of lives of the saints by Sabine Baring-Gould, first published between 1872 and 1877 by John Hodges, of London, and later republished in Edinburgh in 1914.

The volumes are arranged according to the month of each saint's principal feast day.

Volumes
The Lives of the Saints: Volume I - January
The Lives of the Saints: Volume II - February
The Lives of the Saints: Volume III - March
The Lives of the Saints: Volume IV - April
The Lives of the Saints: Volume V - May
The Lives of the Saints: Volume VI - June
The Lives of the Saints: Volume VII - July Pt. 1
The Lives of the Saints: Volume VII - July Pt. 2
The Lives of the Saints: Volume VIII - August
The Lives of the Saints: Volume IX - September
The Lives of the Saints: Volume X - October Pt. 1
The Lives of the Saints: Volume X - October Pt. 2
The Lives of the Saints: Volume XI - November Pt. 1
The Lives of the Saints: Volume XI - November Pt. 2
The Lives of the Saints: Volume XII - December 
The Lives of the Saints: Volume XIII - Appendix

References

Holweck, F. G. A Biographical Dictionary of the Saints. St. Louis, MO: B. Herder Book Co. 1924.

Christian hagiography
English non-fiction books